"Exposed to Love" is a dance single by the female dance-pop trio Exposé. Released in December 1985, it was the original group's second single after "Point of No Return," with Alé Lorenzo singing lead vocals. "Exposed to Love" remains the only single to feature vocals from the original group's lineup ("Point of No Return" was subsequently rerecorded with the second lineup) and is featured as such on the album Exposure. Ann Curless, Gioia Bruno, and Jeanette Jurado, the group's current members, share the lead vocals during live performances.

Reception
The single charted on the U.S. Billboard Hot Dance Singles Sales and Hot Dance Club Play charts at #19 and #12, respectively. Billboard named the song #69 on their list of 100 Greatest Girl Group Songs of All Time.

Track listing
Produced and Arranged by Lewis A. Martineé for Pantera Productions.
 US 7" single

 US 12" single

Personnel
 Sandra "Sandeé" Casañas – Vocals
 Alejandra "Alé" Lorenzo – Vocals
 Laurie Miller – Vocals
 George "Jet" Finess – Lead guitar
 Nestor Gomez – Lead and rhythm guitars
 Steve Grove – Saxophone
 Lewis A. Martineé – Keyboards, percussion and drum programming
 Fro Sosa – Synth solos and keyboards
 Mike Couzzi – Recording engineer
 Lewis A. Martineé and Chris Lord-Alge – Mixing

Charts

References

Exposé (group) songs
1985 songs
1985 singles
Songs written by Lewis Martineé
Arista Records singles